The 2017 New Mexico Lobos football team represented the University of New Mexico in the 2017 NCAA Division I FBS football season. The Lobos were led by sixth-year head coach Bob Davie and played their home games at the newly renamed Dreamstyle Stadium. They competed as members of the Mountain Division of the Mountain West Conference. They finished the season 3–9, 1–7 in Mountain West play to finish in last place in the Mountain Division.

Schedule

Source:

Roster

Game summaries

Abilene Christian

New Mexico State

at Boise State

at Tulsa

Air Force

at Fresno State

Colorado State

at Wyoming

Utah State

at Texas A&M

UNLV

at San Diego State

Coaching staff

Source:

Players in the 2018 NFL Draft

References

New Mexico
New Mexico Lobos football seasons
New Mexico Lobos football